Millicent Tshiwela Makhado is a South African actress and voice-over artist, best known for her role as "Agnes Mukwevho" in Muvhango. In 2012, she was nominated for the Africa Movie Academy Award for Best Actress in a Leading Role for playing "Margaret" in 48. She also featured in Scandal!, Man in Crisis and In A Heartbeat.

Born in Madombidzha, Makhado is also into activism and has been part of several projects for sensitizing child and women rights. Aside television, she is also involved in radio productions.

Following the collapse of her first marriage, she was reported to be in another relationship in 2016.

In 2020, she was announced to be playing "Zandile" in the SABC comedy series, Makoti (2019).

References

External links
 

Date of birth missing (living people)
Living people
20th-century South African actresses
21st-century South African actresses
People from Makhado Local Municipality
Year of birth missing (living people)